Pavel Andreyevich Shalin (Cyrillic: Павел Андреевич Шалин; born 15 April 1987 in Lipetsk) is a Russian athlete specialising in the long jump. He won the gold medal at the 2015 Summer Universiade.

His personal bests in the event are 8.25 metres outdoor (Moscow 2010) and 8.08 metres indoor (Moscow 2014). In addition, his triple jump outdoor personal best is 16.56 metres set in Kaunas in 2009.

Competition record

References

1987 births
Living people
Sportspeople from Lipetsk
Russian male long jumpers
Universiade gold medalists in athletics (track and field)
Universiade gold medalists for Russia
Medalists at the 2015 Summer Universiade
Russian Athletics Championships winners